Dirt Dog may refer to:

 Dirt Dog, an athletic nickname given to baseball players
 Dirt Dog (rapper), one of several pseudonyms for Ol' Dirty Bastard
 iRobot Dirt Dog, a cleaning robot
 Dirt Dog, Heavy duty equipment

See also
 Dirty Dog (disambiguation)